The 2021 Macau Grand Prix was a motor race for Formula 4 (F4) cars held on the streets of Macau on 21 November 2021. Just like in 2020, the race was an F4 event (rather than Formula Three), and was part of the Fédération Internationale de l'Automobile (FIA)-administered China Formula 4 Championship for the second time running. The event consisted of two races; an eight-lap qualifying race deciding the starting grid for the twelve-lap main event. The 2021 race was the 68th running of the Macau Grand Prix, the second for F4 cars and the second meeting of the three-round 2021 China Formula 4 Championship.

Background 
After the 2020 Macau Grand Prix was run as a domestic Formula 4 event because of heavy quarantine restrictions introduced due to the COVID-19 pandemic, a return to holding the Grand Prix as a non-championship round of the FIA Formula 3 championship, just like in 2019, was originally planned. In August however, it was announced that there would be no Formula 3 competing in Macau for the second year running, with quarantine regulations still being very strictly enforced. This left the China Formula 4 Championship as the main event during the Macau Grand Prix weekend, staging the second of its three events at the Guia circuit.

Entry List 
All competitors used identical Mygale-chassis M14-F4 Formula 4 cars.

Results

Qualifying

Qualifying race

Main race

See also
 2021 Macau Guia Race

References

External links
 

Macau Grand Prix
Macau Grand Prix
Macau Grand Prix Formula Four
Macau Grand Prix Formula Four